The Dream of the Blue Turtles is the first solo album by English musician Sting, released in June 1985. The album reached number three on the UK Albums Chart and number two on the US Billboard 200.

Five singles were released from the album: "If You Love Somebody Set Them Free," "Fortress Around Your Heart," "Russians," "Moon Over Bourbon Street," and "Love Is the Seventh Wave". The album earned Grammy nominations for Album of the Year, Best Male Pop Vocal Performance, Best Jazz Instrumental Performance and Best Engineered Recording.

Background and release 
Sting initially worked on tracks for his debut solo album with producers Torch Song: William Orbit, Laurie Mayer and Grant Gilbert. These sessions were more synth-driven and 'electrofunk' in nature than what eventually was recorded and released; Sting eventually decided against this direction, and instead decided to pursue more jazz-oriented music. The initial 1984 Torch Song sessions remain unreleased.

The album is named after a dream that Sting had.

Although the single "If You Love Somebody Set Them Free" reached No. 3 in the US, it only reached 26 in the UK, where the album's track "Russians" (about Cold War nuclear anxieties, which had peaked in the 1980s) proved more popular.

In the UK the album was kept off No. 1 in the week of its release by Marillion's Misplaced Childhood and Born in the U.S.A. by Bruce Springsteen occupying the top two places. However, in the US, the album reached No. 2 on the Billboard 200.

The film Bring On the Night documents some of the recording work that produced this album, as well as the subsequent tour.

Songs
The songs include "Children's Crusade" (paralleling the destruction of the younger generation in World War I to the devastation brought about by heroin addiction in modern-day London); the original uptempo arrangement of The Police song "Shadows in the Rain"; "We Work the Black Seam" (about the UK miners' strike of 1984–85, and musically based on "Savage Beast", a song dating back to Sting's days in Last Exit); and "Moon Over Bourbon Street", a song inspired by Anne Rice's novel Interview with the Vampire and on which he plays double bass. "Consider Me Gone" references the first quatrain of Shakespeare's Sonnet 35.

Accolades
Grammy Awards

|-
| style="width:35px; text-align:center;" rowspan="2"|1986 || rowspan="2"| The Dream of the Blue Turtles || Album of the Year || 
|-
| Best Pop Vocal Performance, Male|| 
|-

Track listing

B-sides
 "Another Day" – 3:54
 "Gabriel's Message" – 2:15

Singles
"If You Love Somebody Set Them Free" (1985) #3 US Hot 100, #26 UK Singles Chart
"Russians" (1985) #16 US Hot 100, #12 UK Singles Chart
"Fortress Around Your Heart" (1985) #8 US Hot 100, #49 UK Singles Chart
"Love Is the Seventh Wave" (1985) #17 US Hot 100, #41 UK Singles Chart
"Moon Over Bourbon Street" (1986) #44 UK Singles Chart – with a B-side of "The Ballad of Mack the Knife"

Personnel 
 Sting – vocals, guitars, double bass on (9), arrangements 
 Darryl Jones – bass guitar
 Kenny Kirkland – keyboards
 Branford Marsalis – soprano saxophone, tenor saxophone, clarinet, percussion
 Dominic Muldowney – additional arrangements (10)
 Dolette McDonald – backing vocals
 Janice Pendarvis – backing vocals
 Omar Hakim – drums

Additional personnel 
 Danny Quatrochi – Synclavier, backing vocals
 Robert Ashworth – guitars
 Eddy Grant – congas (7)
 Frank Opolko – trombone (2)
 Pete Smith – backing vocals
 Elliot Jones – backing vocals
 Jane Alexander – backing vocals
 Vic Garbarini – backing vocals
 Pamela Quinlan – backing vocals
 The Nannies Chorus – backing vocals
 Rosemary Purt – backing vocals
 Stephanie Crewdson – backing vocals
 Joe Sumner – backing vocals
 Kate Sumner – backing vocals
 Michael Sumner – backing vocals

Production 
 Pete Smith – producer, engineer
 Sting – producer
 Jim Scott – engineer
 Bob Ludwig – mastering at Masterdisk (New York, NY).
 Max Vadukul – photography
 Danny Quatrochi – photography
 Michael Ross – art direction, design
 Richard Frankel – art direction, design

Charts

Weekly charts

Year-end charts

Decade-end charts

Certifications and sales

References

1985 debut albums
Sting (musician) albums
A&M Records albums
Albums recorded at Le Studio